The Eberstadt Stalactite Cave (or Eberstadter Tropfsteinhöhle) is a German show cave located in Bauland at the transition of Southeastern Odenwald forest in the North of Baden-Württemberg. It was discovered in December 1971 after blasting operations in a Muschelkalk quarry, and opened to the public in 1973. Since then it has been used as a show cave and is one of the attractions of the "Geo-Nature park Bergstrasse-Odenwald".

It lies in the lower Muschelkalk and contains rich stalactite ornaments such as slender and cone-like stalagmites and sinterflags, sinterterraces and crystals. As the cave was closed after its discovery and guided tours have only used electric light, the dripstones have been preserved are mostly still chalk-white; this is in contrast to older German show caves in where candles and torches were used which lead to the blackened of stones. The Eberstadter Tropfsteinhöhle is thought to be one of the most beautiful show caves in Germany.

About the cave
The Eberstadt Stalactite Cave is a dripstone cave in Bauland at the transition of Southeastern Odenwald in the North of Baden-Württemberg.

The cave temperature is constant at  year-round, with a humidity of approximately 95%. The age of the cave is estimated at between one and two million years. During this time, all forms of sintering on the walls or on the cave floor have been created, including stalactites (dripping stones hanging from the cave ceiling) and stalagmite drips that grow up from the cave bottom.

Visitor access to the cave is by trails, and it is accessible for wheelchair users. It was adapted for high numbers of visitors, with a large parking lot at the foot of the cave, including for tourist buses. In 2011 a small visitor center opened with its architecture intending to symbolize the crevices and distortions of the Muschelkalk. It informs about landscape development in the karst of the area and the development of the cave. The city staffs tourguides, who lead groups through the cave for about an hour year-round between March to the end of October every day, during the winter months only on weekends and holidays. In 1995, a less than one-kilometer-long geological trail (0.6-mile) was created into the mining areas of the neighboring quarry. Information panels explain about the origin of the dripstone cave and the most important geological formations in Baden-Württemberg on the basis of exposed rock patterns.

History
The cave owes its discovery to chance in a limestone quarry: On December 13, 1971, a larger cavity was drilled in preparation of a blasting. After part of the demolished material had been cleared, a fresh cave wall running east to west, about eight meters high above the quarry floor and about ten meters below the upper level, showed a cavern opening about two meters wide and one meter high.

The floor of the cave covered a layer of clay about one to one and a half meters thick. The water was 10 to 15 centimeters above loamy-soft ground. The visit was therefore laborious at first. The most difficult passage was at Vesuvius, where a rock stage with a rope ladder, later with wooden ladders, had to be overcome.

The press was informed how preliminary explorations revealed the beauty of a natural monument, unique in southern Germany. On the same day the news of the cave discovery spread in the village. Many inhabitants went to the quarry to get a personal impression. Photographs still show intact dripping stones which were later damaged. On 14 December, the press and television reported on the discovery. On the following days the television broadcast several special transmissions, which made the cave widely known. In January 1972 the TV stations made further records of the cave, which showed it in its original, still untouched state. Immediately after the discovery, rumors spread that the cave was not stable and was to be closed again. In order to procure souvenirs, several people pushed into the cave and knocked dripping stones off.

Because the cave was particularly large and beautiful, and the dripping stones had a great variety of forms, it was found worthy for preservation and development. The Landratsamt Buchen presented them with an interim injunction under nature protection, and 6 years later it was classified as a natural monument (FND).

On 15 December 1971 the District Office of Buchen ordered the demolition of the stone quarries. Later, investigations of the stability of the cave ridges and the drip stones showed that quarrying could be maintained at the same time as the cave was used. The explosions in the quarry resumed at a minimum distance of 50 meters to the cave and an important employer of the municipality remained. On December 16, 1971, the town council decided to expand the dripstone cave into a show cave. In order to protect it against further damage, first the entrance was walled in and a door installed. This, too, proved unsuccessful as thieves descended from above and broke the door. Geologists and cave explorers traveled to visit the cave. Experts from the Geological Land Office, the Association of German Cave and Karst Researchers and the Nature Conservation Commissioners advised on the expansion of the cave.

See also 
 List of show caves in Germany

Literature

References

External links 

 Official website of Eberstadter Tropfsteinhöhle
 Eberstadter Tropfsteinhöhle im Geopark Odenwald www.geo-naturpark.net
 Themenpark Umwelt: Eberstadter Tropfsteinhöhle
 Schauhöhlen in Deutschland – Eberstadter Tropfsteinhöhle www.showcaves.com/
 geotope description by the Baden-Württemberg State Department for the Environment and Geology

Caves of Germany
Karst caves
Springs of Germany
Landforms of Baden-Württemberg
Show caves in Germany
Tourist attractions in Baden-Württemberg
Paleoanthropological sites